The 2008–09 Eredivisie was the 49th season of the Eredivisie, the highest level of ice hockey competition in the Netherlands. The season started in November, following the completion of the league cup, won by the Tilburg Trappers.

With the addition of the Utrecht Dragons and the Groningen Grizzlies, ten teams participated (a record for the Eredivisie). The season consisted of 24 games.  The Utrecht Dragons fared poorly in their first and only season, folding its professional team at the end of the season.

The top eight teams qualified for the playoffs.   In the best-of-three quarterfinals, Tilburg beat Eindhoven 2-0, The Hague beat Amsterdam 2-0, Geleen beat Groningen 2-0, and Nijmegen beat Heerenveen 2-1.  In the best-of-five semifinals, Tilburg beat Nijmegen 3-2 and The Hague beat Geleen 3-0.  HYS The Hague won its first national championship since 1969 by beating Tilburg in the best-of-five finals 3 games to 2.

Regular season 
 
 (* The Nijmegen Devils had two points deducted)

Playoffs

References

External links
Season on hockeyarchives.info
 Results at official website

Neth
Eredivisie (ice hockey) seasons
Ere 
Ere 

nl:Eredivisie ijshockey 2009/10